Sainte-Marie-Kerque is a commune in the Pas-de-Calais department in the Hauts-de-France region of France.

Geography
Sainte-Marie-Kerque is located some 8 miles (13 km) to the east of Calais on the D224E1 and D218E1 roads.

Population

Places of interest
 The church of Notre-Dame, dating from the fifteenth century.
 The church of St.Nicholas, dating from the nineteenth century.
 The Château du Wetz.

See also
 Communes of the Pas-de-Calais department

References

Saintemariekerque